Let Hpaw or Retpu is a village, village tract of Hlut Shan (Lutshan) in Kyain Seikgyi Township, Kawkareik District, Kayin State, Myanmar (Burma). It lies on the alongside of Thailand–Burma Railway.

Camp Rephaw
Camp Rephaw (also 30 Kilo) was a prisoner of war camp on the Burma Railway during World War II. It started as a large work camp. The first prisoners arrived on 26 December 1942, and were tasked to lay 15 kilometres of railway to Anakwin. During the monsoon season, there was a shortage of food. On 1 July, a hospital camp was established at Rephaw, and subject to strafing attacks by the allied airforces.

References

Populated places in Kayin State
Burma Railway